Robin Brew (born 28 June 1962) is a male former competition swimmer for Great Britain and Scotland.

Swimming career
Brew represented Great Britain at the Olympic Games and Scotland in the Commonwealth Games. He swam in the men's 200-metre individual medley at the 1984 Summer Olympics where he came fourth. His greatest sporting moment came at the 1984 Los Angeles Olympics when he broke the Olympic record in the 200-metre individual medley in the semifinals. "I pretty much went to the Olympic Games without expectations. I'd done my research and I knew, really, that there were two swimmers way ahead of the game. On the day I had a great heat, I just tried too hard in the final and that for me has been a lesson in life; you've got to apply just the right amount of pressure. If you over hurt yourself early on it really comes back on you. It's got to be 100% not a 110%, 110% is a 90% return."

At the ASA National British Championships he won the 200 metres medley title in 1980 and 1983.

Personal life
Robin Brew held the position as the Director of Swimming at Mount Kelly School, for 16 years after his father Archibald Brew who held the position for 20 years. His brother Paul Brew is also a former international swimmer. Both brothers attended Kelly College. Brew now runs his business RobinBrewSports acting as a triathlon and swim coach.

See also
 List of Commonwealth Games medallists in swimming (men)

References

1962 births
Living people
Sportspeople from Portsmouth
Scottish male swimmers
British male swimmers
Olympic swimmers of Great Britain
Swimmers at the 1984 Summer Olympics
Swimmers at the 1982 Commonwealth Games
Swimmers at the 1986 Commonwealth Games
Commonwealth Games silver medallists for Scotland
Commonwealth Games bronze medallists for Scotland
Commonwealth Games medallists in swimming
Medallists at the 1982 Commonwealth Games